The .223 WSSM (Winchester Super Short Magnum, 5.56×42mm) is a .224 caliber rifle cartridge created by Winchester and Browning based on a shortened version of the Winchester Short Magnum case.

History 
The .223 WSSM was introduced in 2003 by the Browning Arms Company, Winchester Ammunition, and Winchester Repeating Arms Company.   The .223 designation is a reference to the popular .223 Remington. It is currently claimed to be the fastest production .22 caliber round in the world with muzzle velocities as high as 4,600 feet per second (1,402 meters per second), but this is not completely true. The .220 Swift still holds the record as the fastest .22 caliber centerfire cartridge with a published velocity of 4665 fps using a 29 grain projectile and 42 grains of 3031 powder.

Complaints 
Even before the cartridge was commercially introduced, it was claimed  that it would be extremely hard on barrels and high wear would lead to short barrel life. Another criticism is that, although the round is suited for long range varmint hunting, it is not good for medium game any farther than 200 yards.

The Winchester made Model 70 in .223 WSSM has not been revived in the new Browning-made Winchester Model 70s, but Browning has chosen to use chrome-lined barrels on all of its guns chambered for .223 WSSM and has introduced the .223 WSSM cartridge as a chambering in its A-bolt rifles. Browning rejects the charge that the .223 WSSM round is especially hard on barrels: "The 223 and 243 WSSM cartridges are said to 'burn up' barrels in as little as 300 rounds. Nothing could be further from the truth."

Advantages
According to Browning, the .223 WSSM offers a  gain 
with a  bullet over the standard .223 Rem.   
It also offers a  gain over the .22-250, a popular varmint round.
This comes out to a  gain over a standard .223 Rem, and a  gain over the .22-250.

See also
 .22 Eargesplitten Loudenboomer
 Winchester Super Short Magnum
 5.6×57mm
 List of rifle cartridges
 Table of handgun and rifle cartridges
 5 mm/35 SMc
 5 mm caliber
 .223 Remington

References 

Browning Press Release
Chuckhawks .223 WSSM page
Reloading info from Guns and Ammo Magazine 
Super Short Magnums - The Rest of the Story
Super Duper Shortie

External links
 The .223 WSSM at WSSM Zone

Pistol and rifle cartridges
Winchester Super Short Magnum rifle cartridges